Carlos Redruello Nimo (born 23 June 1997), commonly known as Redru, is a Spanish footballer who plays for Marbella FC as a left back.

Club career
Born in Seville, Andalusia, Redru joined Real Betis' youth setup in 2012, from Calavera CF. On 12 May 2017, while still a junior, he renewed his contract until 2021.

Redru made his senior debut with the B-team on 6 November 2016, starting in a 2–1 Tercera División home win against CD Utrera. He scored his first goal the following 2 April, netting the equalizer in a 1–1 home draw against UB Lebrijana.

Redru made his first team debut on 24 October 2017, playing the full 90 minutes in a 2–1 away win against Cádiz CF, for the season's Copa del Rey. The following 4 May, he was loaned to Elche CF in the third division until the end of the play-offs.

On 22 January 2019, Redru's loan was terminated, and he moved to Racing de Santander also in a temporary deal just hours later.

On 16 July 2019, Betis announced the transfer of Redru to third division side Marbella FC.

References

External links

1997 births
Living people
Footballers from Seville
Spanish footballers
Association football defenders
Segunda División players
Segunda División B players
Tercera División players
Betis Deportivo Balompié footballers
Real Betis players
Elche CF players
Racing de Santander players
Marbella FC players